The governor of Camarines Sur is the chief executive of the Philippine province of Camarines Sur.

Previously located in Naga City, the seat of the Governor has been located in Pili, Camarines Sur since 1955, after the transfer of the provincial capital there due to the inauguration of Naga as an independent city.

List of governors

References
Past governors of Camarines Sur

Government of Camarines Sur
Governors of provinces of the Philippines